Alexander Vasiliyevich Golovin (born 5 September 1949) is a Russian diplomat with the diplomatic rank of Plenipotentiary Ambassador.

Golovin graduated from the Moscow State Institute of International Relations in 1971, and went on to work in various posts with the Ministry of Foreign Affairs of the USSR. From 1993 –1996 he was Senior Adviser to the Embassy of Russia in Berlin, and from 1996 –2000 was director of the Fourth European Department at the Russian Ministry of Foreign Affairs.

His first ambassadorial appointment came in 2000, when he was appointed by Vladimir Putin at Ambassador of Russia to Austria from 4 August 2000, and held this post until 6 August 2004.

Right now he is Ambassador of Russia to Switzerland, since 27. March 2012.

Golovin speaks Russian, English, German and French.

References

1949 births
Living people
Moscow State Institute of International Relations alumni
Ambassador Extraordinary and Plenipotentiary (Russian Federation)
Ambassadors of Russia to Austria
Ambassadors of Russia to Switzerland